Street Signs is an album by American rock band Ozomatli, released in 2004 by Real World Records and Concord Records. Street Signs was included in Robert Dimery's 1001 Albums You Must Hear Before You Die.

This album won the Latin Grammy Award for Best Alternative Music Album at the Latin Grammy Awards of 2005. The song "Saturday Night" was featured in the video games Madden NFL 2005, MX vs. ATV Unleashed, and Sleeping Dogs, in the soundtrack to the film Turbo, and the trailer for the 2010 comedy film Hot Tub Time Machine.

Reception

Street Signs was awarded the Grammy for Best Latin Rock/Alternative Album in 2005, as well as a Latin Grammy for Best Alternative Music Album in the same year.

Track listing
 "Believe" (Andy Mendoza, Ozomatli, J. Smith-Freeman) – 5:02
 "Love & Hope" (JB Eckl, Ozomatli, K. C. Porter) – 4:24
 "Street Signs" (Ozomatli, Smith-Freeman) – 3:45
 "(Who Discovered) America?" (Eckl, Porter, Jason Roberts, Asdru Sierra) – 4:35
 "Who's to Blame" (Don Corleon, Daniel Lewis) – 3:13
 "Te Estoy Buscando" (Ozomatli) – 3:50
 "Saturday Night" (Ozomatli, Smith-Freeman) – 3:59
 "Déjame en Paz" (Ozomatli) – 3:29
 "Santiago" (Ozomatli) – 5:10
 "Ya Viene el Sol (The Beatle Bob Remix)" (Ozomatli) – 3:39
 "Doña Isabelle" (Ozomatli, Eddie Palmieri) – 1:05
 "Nadie Te Tira" (Ozomatli) – 4:47
 "Cuando Canto" (Ozomatli) – 4:40

Japanese bonus track
"Como Canto (Live)"

Personnel
Ozomatli
Wil-Dog Abers – bass, orchestral arrangement, percussion arrangement, vocals
Ulises Bella – keyboards, saxophone, melodica, requinto, vocals
Sheffer Bruton – trombone
Mario Calire – drums
DJ Spinobi – turntables
Jabu – rap
Raúl Pacheco – guitar, jarana, tres, vocals
Justin Porée – percussion, rap, remixing
Asdru Sierra – acoustic guitar, piano, trumpet, vocals
Jiro Yamaguchi – percussion, tabla, orchestral arrangement, percussion arrangement, vocals

Additional musicians
Beatle Bob – introduction on "Ya Viene el Sol (The Beatle Bob Remix)"
Chali 2na – rap on "Who's to Blame"
Cut Chemist – turntables
Forte Music City of Prague Orchestra – strings on "Believe"
Hassan Hakmoun – vocals on "Believe"
David Hidalgo – arpa jarocha, requinto
Paul Livingstone – sitar
Walter Miranda – piano
Eddie Palmieri – piano on "Doña Isabelle" and "Nadie Te Tira"
Greg Poree – acoustic guitar
K. C. Porter – Hammond organ
Les Yeux Noirs – strings on "Believe" and "Love & Hope"

Technical personnel
John Burk – executive producer, A&R
Robert Carranza – engineer
Chali 2na – producer
Don Corleon – producer
Chris Dunn – A&R
Chris Gehringer – mastering engineer
Serban Ghenea – mixing engineer, remixing
John Hanes – digital audio editor, remixing
Mary Hogan – A&R
Christian Lantry – photography
Christopher Lennertz – orchestral arrangement
Daniel "Blaxxx" Lewis – producer
Bob O'Connor – A&R
Ozomatli – producer, engineer, remixing
K. C. Porter – producer
Seth Presant – engineer
Anton Pukshansky – Engineer
Jason Roberts – programming, producer
Tim Roberts – assistant
Bob Salcedo – engineer
T-Ray – producer
Ken Takahashi – engineer

Chart performance

References

2004 albums
Real World Records albums
Ozomatli albums
Latin Grammy Award for Best Alternative Music Album
Grammy Award for Best Latin Rock, Urban or Alternative Album